In mathematics, in the field of ring theory, a lattice is a module over a ring which is embedded in a vector space over a field, giving an algebraic generalisation of the way a lattice group is embedded in a real vector space.

Formal definition
Let R be an integral domain with field of fractions K.  An R-submodule M of a K-vector space V is a lattice if M is finitely generated over R.  It is full if V = K · M.

Pure sublattices
An R-submodule N of M that is itself a lattice is an R-pure sublattice if M/N is R-torsion-free.  There is a one-to-one correspondence between R-pure sublattices N of M and K-subspaces W of V, given by

See also
 Lattice (group), for the case where M is a Z-module embedded in a vector space V over the field of real numbers R, and the Euclidean metric is used to describe the lattice structure

References

 

Module theory